is a Japanese gymnast. She competed in seven events at the 1956 Summer Olympics.

References

1933 births
Living people
Japanese female artistic gymnasts
Olympic gymnasts of Japan
Gymnasts at the 1956 Summer Olympics
Place of birth missing (living people)